The 1982–83 St. Louis Blues season was the 16th in franchise history.  It involved the team finishing the regular-season with a 25-40-15 record, with a total of 65 points, placing them fourth in the Norris Division.  It ended with a Norris Division Semifinal loss to the Chicago Black Hawks in four games.

On January 12, Ralston Purina Company attempted to sell the club to Edmonton Oilers founder Bill Hunter, who had plans to move the team to Saskatoon, Saskatchewan.  The NHL would eventually veto the deal, resulting in the team not participating in the Entry Draft.  It would pave the way for Harry Ornest to purchase the franchise prior to the following season.

Offseason

Regular season

Final standings

Schedule and results

Playoffs

Player statistics

Regular season
Scoring

Goaltending

Playoffs
Scoring

Goaltending

Awards and records

Transactions

Draft picks
St. Louis's draft picks at the 1982 NHL Entry Draft held at the Montreal Forum in Montreal, Quebec.

Farm teams

See also
1982–83 NHL season

References

External links

St. Louis Blues seasons
St. Louis
St. Louis
St Louis
St Louis